Mesoblast Limited is an Australian-based regenerative medicine company. It seeks to provide treatments for inflammatory ailments, cardiovascular disease and back pain. The company is led by Silviu Itescu, who founded the company in 2004.

Mesenchymal lineage cells 
The company is developing a range of regenerative products derived from its proprietary mesenchymal lineage cells. This includes Mesenchymal Precursor Cells (MPCs) and Mesenchymal Stem Cells (MSCs). It is the hope of Mesoblast that these cells will behave like their natural counterparts, when injected into a patient. Such behavior would require the cells to survive in a patient's body, despite the action of the immune system, which functions to destroy anything that is foreign.

Use 
In the laboratory, highly purified and immunoselected MPCs and the culture expanded MSCs secrete trophic factors that have multiple potential actions. It is hoped that Mesenchymal lineage precursors will retain the ability of their natural counterparts. They have the ability to detect injury and inflammation and respond to local stimuli and signals from the injured tissue by releasing a wide range of biomolecules (growth factors, chemokines, enzymes etc.) that induce the body's own tissue to grow and regenerate, effectively repairing the injury. Which specific factors are released by mesenchymal precursors in any given tissue presumably depends on the signals they encounter from the damaged tissue itself. For example, with back pain, the MPCs are injected into the damaged disc in the hope that it will regenerate it.

Research and development 
Mesoblast is developing products in four major areas.
 Immunologic and inflammatory – Cells are administered intravenously to impart immuno-modulatory effects.
 Cardiac and vascular – Cells are administered locally with the aim of improving heart anatomy and function.
 Orthopedic diseases of the spine – Cells are locally administered to potentially repair intervertebral discs or generate new bone
 Oncology - Improving outcomes of bone marrow transplantation in patients with cancer or genetic diseases.

Back pain 
Mesoblast's investigational product candidate MPC-06-ID is being developed to target the population of patients suffering from moderate to severe chronic low back pain due to moderately degenerated discs.

2010 
In Mesoblast's annual report from August 2010, the company first announced positive results of preclinical trials showing radiographic and pathologic disc regeneration with MPC-06-ID. Mesoblast said they were in the process of completing an Investigational New Drug (IND) submission to the United States FDA to commence Phase 2 clinical trials in patients with low back pain due to disc degenerative disease.

2011
On June 29, 2011, Mesoblast announced that it received clearance from the Food and Drug Administration to begin a Phase 2 trial with its MPC cells for treatment of disc degenerative disease. This trial is primarily designed to assess the safety and efficacy of the cells.

2012 
Osiris sold its MSC drug and patents to Mesoblast Ltd. With the potential of $100 million, the first $35 million in consideration, approximately 43% was paid to Osiris in Mesoblast common shares with the balance paid in cash. Product royalties start in low-single digits and will grow to 10% on revenues exceeding $750 million.

2014
In January 2014, Mesoblast announced positive results of the Phase 2 trial for back pain treatment. It included 100 patients with moderate to severe back pain that were evaluated in a randomized, placebo controlled study. Patients were treated across 13 sites in the US and Australia. The results showed that 69% of patients given a 6 million dose of MPCs and 62% given an 18 million dose experienced a more than 50% reduction in low back pain at 12 months. This compares to around 35% for the controls. Patients underwent the outpatient injection for a single painful degenerated lumbar level and evaluated for safety and efficacy over a total of 36 months to evaluate long-term treatment effects. Other key findings included improvements in function and disc stability.

The participating sites were Arizona Pain Specialists, UC Davis Spine Center, the Spine Institute, IPM Medical Group, Inc., Denver Spine, Rocky Mountain Associates in Orthopedic Medicine, P.C., Emory University School of Medicine, Carolina Neurosurgery and Spine Associates, Central Texas Spine Institute, Richmond Bone and Joint Clinic, Memorial Hermann Medical Group, Washington Center for Pain Management, The Center for Pain Relief, Inc. and Monash Medical Centre of Victoria, Australia.

In August 2014, Mesoblast announced in its 2014 results and corporate strategy that the Food and Drug Administration granted approval to advance to an MPC Phase 3 trial for chronic lower back pain.

In November 2014, in Japan, the Pharmaceuticals, Medical Devices and Other Therapeutic Products Act (PMD Act) took effect. This Act established a pathway for expedited approval in Japan for regenerative medical products. Japan's new policy requires an early stage clinical trial (i.e. Phase I or small Phase II) at the minimum to confirm safety of the therapy and provide evidence of efficacy. Rather than requiring that the therapy then be evaluated in subsequent trials before making it available to patients, Japan's new law will allow for a “conditional approval” enabling the product to be brought to market, and for the product to obtain reimbursement in an accelerated manner. Conditional approval does not mean that the regulatory approval process is over. It simply allows the therapy to be made available to patients earlier in the process, and for the sponsor company to begin commercialization and obtain reimbursement.
As a result, Mesoblast announced they would leverage existing Phase 2 clinical trial results for Tier 1 and Tier 2 product candidates. Tier 1 includes MPC cells for back pain. Conditional approval would last seven years.

In March 2014, Circulation Journal published results of a clinical trial using MPC's as adjunctive therapy for patients with a Ventricular Assist Device. 50% of patients with MPC therapy achieved temporary weaning from LVAD compared to 20% of the control group at 90days.

2015
On January 14, 2015, Mesoblast confirmed Phase 3 had already begun. The company also provided projected timeframes. Mesoblast anticipates patient enrollment completion in mid-2016, an interim analysis in mid-2016 and top-line data in mid-2017.
The objective of the Phase 3 clinical program will be to confirm the positive outcomes seen in the company's Phase 2 clinical trial where product candidate, MPC-06-ID, demonstrated the potential to provide durable improvement in pain and function for patients who have CDLBP due to degenerative disc disease. The primary endpoint in the Phase 3 program will seek to confirm the treatment benefit seen in Phase 2 for MPC-06-ID against saline control using a composite of durable improvement in pain and function.

On February 10, 2015, Mesoblast was granted a key patent by the United States Patent and Trademark Office (USPTO) covering its proprietary Mesenchymal Precursor Cell (MPC) technology for use in the treatment of degenerated intervertebral discs. Granted US patent number 8,858,932 provides Mesoblast with exclusive commercial rights through to June 2029. There is also potential for patent term and regulatory exclusivity extensions which would provide longer term protection.

On March 19, 2015, Mesoblast announced that it has been selected by the Japan External Trade Organization (JETRO) as the only regenerative medicine company worldwide to receive fast track access to potential investment incentives across all levels of government in Japan. Mesoblast will receive a specially tailored market and government incentive roadmap aimed at providing a more attractive business environment. Mesoblast Chief Executive Silviu Itescu welcomed the recognition from the Japanese Government.
“Japan is a major market for our cell-based therapeutics and offers near-term potential for product approvals and revenues. The selection of Mesoblast by JETRO as the only regenerative medicine company to receive investment priority status will guide the strategic direction of our commercial plans in Japan, in conjunction with our current and future strategic partners.”

On April 8, 2015, Mesoblast announced it intended to expand the Phase 3 clinical program of its product candidate MPC-06-ID in the treatment of chronic low back pain due to degenerative disc disease to include sites in the European Union (EU). This announcement came shortly after a positive meeting with the European Medicines Agency (EMA). The discussions with EMA occurred as part of combined scientific and reimbursement advice under an EU pilot program known as Shaping European Early Dialogues (SEED). The SEED pilot program was established to facilitate early dialogue between EMA, European Health Technology Assessment (HTA) reimbursement bodies, and selected companies with late-stage clinical development programs. Mesoblast's product candidate MPC-06-ID is one of only seven medicines accepted for the SEED program.

On September 20, 2015, Mesoblast's Annual Report stated that Phase 3 would actually consist of two clinical trials. The first trial, initiated in December 2014, has been recruiting candidates across multiple sites in the United States. No start date was mentioned for the second trial. The two studies will be double-blinded, and include approximately 330 patients each. The composite primary end point of pain relief and improved function consists of a 50% reduction in lower back pain. This is measured by VAS and a 15-point improvement in Oswestry Disability Index (ODI) at both 6 and 12 months, with no intervention at 12 months and will be used in the Phase 3 program.

On December 17, 2015, as part of the first quarter report, Mesoblast announced they anticipated patient enrollment completion for the first of two trials for phase 3 by third quarter, or mid-2016. No information was given about the second trial.

2016
In February 2016, as part of Mesoblast's second quarter (ending December 31, 2015) and first half financial results, the company reported that recruitment for the phase 3 back pain trial was progressing well across the United States. For the first time, information was provided regarding the second trial. Mesoblast outlined key milestones that included the first trial's results to be completed by the 4th quarter of 2016, or June 30, 2016. The second trial's results should be complete by the 4th quarter of 2017, or June 30, 2017.

In August 2016, as part of Mesoblast's Annual Report, Mesoblast reported that the current 360 patient Phase 3 trial was recruiting well across US sites.
In addition, Mesoblast noted that the FDA has provided written guidance that included use of a composite primary endpoint is acceptable for approval, agreed thresholds for pain (50% decrease in VAS) and function (15 point improvement in ODI), two time points (12 and 24 months) for meeting pain and functional improvement criteria and no intervention at the treated level of the spine through 24 months. Mesoblast stated they intend to conduct an interim analysis in the Phase 3 trial in Q1 CY 2017.

In December 2016, Mesoblast and Mallinckrodt Pharmaceuticals entered into an agreement to exclusively negotiate a commercial and development partnership for MPC-06-ID in the treatment of chronic low back pain due to disc degeneration.

2017
In early 2017, the U.S. government website that lists Mesoblast's study provided key milestones. The estimated study completion date is February 2020. The estimated primary completion date will be February 2019. This is the final data collection date for primary outcome measure. The only way these dates might change is if Mesoblast's solution for lower back pain is granted Fast Track status from the FDA. This would reduce the FDA's review process from 10 months to 6 months. It would also provide a streamlined rolling review process (completed sections of the Biologics License Application, BLA, can be submitted for FDA review as they become available, instead of waiting for all to be completed).

In March 2017, Mesoblast announced positive results of their 36-month follow-up of their randomized, placebo-controlled, 100 patient Phase 2 trial. A single intra-discal injection of 6 million MPCs resulted in meaningful improvements in both pain and function that were durable for at
least 36 months. “The sustained benefits on pain and function over three years seen with a single injection of Mesoblast’s cell therapy have the potential to transform the treatment paradigm for chronic low back pain due to disc degeneration,” said trial investigator Dr Hyun Bae, Professor of Surgery and Director of Education at the Cedars Sinai Spine Center, and Director of the Spine Institute in Los Angeles, CA. “Instead of replacing or fusing the disc, there is mounting compelling evidence that we can use this regenerative medicine to heal the disc. We are fast approaching this inflection point in the treatment of low back pain, which is particularly important in view of the epidemic of opioid abuse."

In May 2017, Mesoblast noted in the 3rd Quarter report that they target patient enrollment completion of the Phase 3 back pain trial by the end of 2017.
 In October 2017, Mesoblast confirmed that they still anticipated patient enrollment completion by the end of 2017.

During the November 16, 2017 CEO Presentation to Annual General Meeting, Mesoblast said patient enrollment completion slipped to 1st quarter 2018.

2018
On March 29, 2018, Mesoblast announced it had completed patient enrollment for its Phase 3 trial. Mesoblast Chief Executive Dr. Silviu Itescu said, "There is an urgent need to provide an effective treatment for patients suffering from chronic low back pain due to degenerative disc disease, a population which today accounts for 50% of prescription opioid usage. If the Phase 3 results demonstrate durable improvement in pain and function, MPC-06-ID has the potential to make a major difference in patients with this serious medical condition."

In addition to Mesoblast's announcement, other key milestones were delayed as well. On the U.S. government website, the estimated primary completion date was delayed from February 2019 to October 2019. The estimated study completion date also slipped from February 2020 to October 2020.

On August 29, 2018, Mesoblast reported its Annual and Fourth Quarter results. Included was a brief mention of the Phase 3 trial for back pain. Mesoblast reported that a total of 404 patients across 48 sites are being followed for evaluation of treatment related improvement in pain and function over two years.

2019
Study completion dates for Mesoblast's solution for chronic low back pain were delayed again. On the U.S. government website for clinical trials, the estimated primary completion date slipped from October 2019 to March 2020. In addition, the estimated study completion date also slipped from October 2020 to March 2021. In total, the estimated primary completion date has been delayed over one year, as its original date was February 2019 and now is March 2020. The estimated study completion date originally was February 2020 and is now March 2021.

During the company's half year financial results in February, Mesoblast reported that a key milestone for the second half of 2019 would be that all patients will complete their 12-month assessment for safety and efficacy.

2020
In October, it was reported that Mesoblast is expected to receive results from its chronic heart failure and phase three lower back pain trials by the end of the 2020. Additionally, Mesoblast and its partner Grünenthal GmbH are collaborating for a confirmatory phase three trial in Europe.

2021
On March 31, Mesoblast reported half-year results. Results from Phase 3 trial of rexlemestrocel-L (MPC-06-ID) in 404 patients with chronic low
back pain (CLBP) due to degenerative disc disease (DDD) showed that a single injection of rexlemestrocel-L + hyaluronic acid (HA) carrier may provide at least two years of pain reduction, with opioid sparing activity in patients using opioids at baseline. Mesoblast also reported significant and durable reductions in CLBP through 24 months were seen across the entire evaluable study population, and greatest pain reduction was observed in the pre-specified population with CLBP of shorter duration than the study median of 68 months. The results indicate that treatment benefit may be greatest when inflammation is high and before irreversible fibrosis has occurred in the intervertebral disc. Mesoblast announced they intend to meet with FDA to discuss a potential pathway for approval of rexlemestrocel-L in patients with chronic discogenic lower back pain based on the observed durable reduction in pain and opioid sparing activity in the CLBP Phase 3 trial.

Criticism
Mesoblast's solution for back pain came under heavy criticism from competitor Regenexx in August 2015. Dr. Chris Centeno said the trial results were "spit shined" with confusing and misleading language, press releases for phases 1 and 2 did not include images of MRIs to prove that discs were regenerated and expressed doubts about maintaining cell quality while mass-producing cells. He also said the host's immune system removes the injected stem cells.

Centeno said: "Whenever you see a company drop key imaging results that are needed to impress insurers (like positive MRI changes in the spine) you can almost bet that there are serious troubles brewing. Then when you observe that what should take a few sentences to describe whether or not the product helped pain and function actually takes an entire page of reported numbers sliced and diced 10 different ways, you know there are serious issues."

Rheumatoid Arthritis
On January 11, 2016, announced results showing significant benefit in the first cohort of Rheumatoid Arthritis patients treated with MPC. After 12 weeks 47% of MPC treated patients and 60% of MPC treated patients(with prior failures of 1or 2 biologics) reached efficacy endpoints (compared to controls at 25% and 17%). Remission was observed at week 12 on 20% of MPC treated patients (0% in controls). On 24 March 2016

US patent 9,265,796
was granted for the use of Mesenchymal Precursor Cells (MPCs)for the treatment or prevention of a broad range of rheumatic conditions, including rheumatoid arthritis, osteoarthritis, psoriatic arthritis, ankylosing spondylitis, sacroiliitis, enteric arthritis, and reactive arthritis.

On January 22, 2016, very encouraging results of a Phase 2 clinical trial on 241 children with acute Graft-versus-host disease were reported, see Graft vs Host Disease, later.

Crohn's disease 
A Phase 3 multi-centered, double-blind, randomized, placebo-controlled trial is evaluating the safety and efficacy of Prochymal® in moderate to severe Crohn's Disease in patients who are resistant to traditional treatments. Preliminary data from two interim analyses planned under the protocol provided encouraging results.

Graft versus host disease 
On September 30, 2014, Mesoblast announced that its Japanese partner, JCR Pharmaceuticals Co Ltd (JCR), filed with the Japanese Pharmaceuticals and Medical Devices Agency (PMDA) to receive approval for manufacturing, marketing, and product registration of the allogeneic or "off-the-shelf" Mesenchymal Stem Cell (MSC) product JR-031 for the treatment of acute graft versus host disease (GVHD) in children and adults.

During the 2015 financial year, Mesoblast's licensee, JCR Pharmaceuticals Ltd, filed for regulatory approval for its GVHD MSC-based product, JR-031, in children and adults in Japan. JR-031 was granted orphan drug priority review. If successful, it will be the first allogeneic cell-based product approved in Japan.

In January 2016, results of a Phase 2 clinical trial on 241 children with acute Graft-versus-host disease, that were not responsive to steroids, were announced. Survival rate was 82% (vs 39% of controls) for those who showed some improvement after 1 month, and in the long term 72% (vs 18% of controls) for those that showed little effect after 1 month. This trial used the MSC-100-IV product.

For the Phase 3 trial in the United States, for the pediatric indication, a 60-patient open label trial was initiated in the 2015 financial year. During the conduct of the pediatric Phase 3 trial, Mesoblast expects to have discussions with the FDA regarding the trial design for a potential Phase 3 trial to support approval of this product for adults with steroid refractory liver or gut GVHD.

On December 19, 2017, Mesoblast announced that the Phase 3 trial completed enrollment. In November 2016, the Phase 3 trial was successful in a pre-specified interim futility analysis of the
primary endpoint.

When the three pivotal trials met their primary endpoints, The Oncologic Drugs Advisory Committee met on August 13, 2020, to review the data supporting the Biologics License Application filed by Mesoblast. The FDA granted Mesoblast Priority Review and a decision by September 30, 2020.

Diabetic nephropathy
On June 9, 2015, Mesoblast announced results from the company's Phase 2 trial in patients with diabetic nephropathy showed that a single infusion of its intravenously delivered allogeneic mesenchymal precursor cell (MPC) product candidate MPC-300-IV was safe, reduced damaging inflammation, and preserved or improved renal function over at least 24 weeks. The results were presented at the late-breaking scientific sessions of the 75th annual meeting of the American Diabetes Association (ADA) that was held in Boston. The ADA annual meeting brings together approximately 14,000 participants, including clinicians and researchers from 124 countries.

COVID-19 Acute Respiratory Distress Symptoms 
Ryoncil was tested in a March 2020 pilot study at Mount Sinai Hospital in New York City on late-stage, ventilator-assisted COVID-19 patients with Acute Respiratory Distress Syndrome. Based on the results, the FDA approved a Phase 2/3 study on 300 patients at 30 sites around the U.S. The Cardiothoracic Surgical Trials Network, funded by the NIH, and Mesoblast (the owner of the product) commenced that trial on May 5, 2020.

Acquisitions, manufacturing and financing 
In December 2010, Mesoblast entered an agreement with US-based Cephalon to develop and commercialize novel adult Mesenchymal Precursor Stem Cell (MPC) therapeutics for degenerative conditions of the cardiovascular and central nervous systems.

In September 2011, Mesoblast entered an agreement with Swiss-based Lonza Group. Under the agreement Lonza will manufacture the stem cells in sufficient quantity to meet the global demand for Mesoblast's MPC cell products. Mesoblast will also have exclusive access to Lonza's Cell Therapy facilities in Singapore for the manufacture of allogeneic cell therapy, subject to certain exceptions.

In October 2013, Mesoblast acquired the entire culture-expanded mesenchymal stem cell (MSC) business of Osiris Therapeutics. Cost savings and other synergies are expected across personnel, capital expenditure, and manufacturing. As a result of this acquisition, Mesoblast also inherited a relationship with Japan-based JCR Pharmaceuticals Co. Ltd.

In May 2014, Mesoblast announced it would receive incentives from the Singapore Economic Development Board (EDB) for activities in Singapore related to manufacturing operations, as well as product development and commercialization.

In June 2015, Mesoblast received $5.8 million from the Australian Government for Research & Development (R&D) activities conducted during the 2014 financial year. The funds were provided to Mesoblast under the Government's R&D Tax Incentive Program, designed to support industry innovation.

In February 2016, Mesoblast's Licensee (JCR Pharmaceuticals Co., Ltd.) sold its first allogeneic cell product TEMCELL® HS Inj., for the treatment of acute graft versus host disease (aGVHD) in children and adults in Japan. TEMCELL is the first allogeneic cell therapy to be fully approved in Japan.

Financial performance 

Mesoblast is listed as MSB on the Australian Securities Exchange (ASX), as MESO on the NASDAQ, and as MEOBF on the ATC Markets.

The company reported its financial results in November 2020. As of September 30, 2020:
 Cash on hand was $108.1 million
 Net loss before tax $25.3 million
Cash outflows for Q1 FY21 were $24.5 million.

References

Regenerative biomedicine